Rhamdioglanis is a genus of three-barbeled catfishes native to South America where they are endemic to Brazil.

Species
There are currently 2 recognized species in this genus:
 Rhamdioglanis frenatus R. von Ihering, 1907
 Rhamdioglanis transfasciatus A. Miranda-Ribeiro, 1908

References

Heptapteridae
Taxa named by Rodolpho von Ihering
Fish of South America
Fish of Brazil
Endemic fauna of Brazil
Catfish genera
Freshwater fish genera